Colyer Meriwether (8 April 1858 – 26 August 1920) was an American historian, educator and writer.

Early life
Meriwether was born at Clark’s Hill, South Carolina. He earned an undergraduate degree at Johns Hopkins University in 1886; and the university awarded him a Ph.D. in 1893.

Career
In 1889-1892, Meriwether was employed by the Japanese government in Sendai.

He was elected a member of the Asiatic Society of Japan and of the American Historical Association. He was secretary and treasurer of the Southern History Association.

Selected works
 History of Higher Education in South Carolina, 1889
 Date Masamune and His Embassy to Rome, 1892

See also
 Foreign government advisors in Meiji Japan

References

1858 births
1920 deaths
Foreign advisors to the government in Meiji-period Japan
Foreign educators in Japan